is a Japanese comedian, ventriloquist, professional rakugo performer (Japanese traditional comedy), actor, and speaker based in Melbourne. She has lived and worked in London, Tokyo, Osaka, Singapore and regularly performs internationally, including the Edinburgh Fringe and Melbourne International Comedy Festival. Showko was a finalist on Australia's Got Talent in 2016, and in 2019 released an Amazon Prime Video called Absolutely Normal in the US and UK. Her stage show is a combination of stand-up comedy and ventriloquism.

Showko regularly performs rakugo (Japanese traditional comedy) and she is a member of the Kamigata Rakugo Association (上方落語協会).

Career
Showko did her rakugo training with Rakugo Master Shōfukutei Kakushow to become a professional rakugo performer. Showko Showfukutei is a stage name awarded to her after completing a three-year Rakugo apprenticeship and she is the only fully trained professional rakugo performer living outside of Japan.

Showko has written, produced and performed her own shows at the Edinburgh Festival Fringe, Brighton Fringe (UK), Avignon Festival (France), Melbourne International Comedy Festival, Sushi Dictator, The Butterfly Club, Melbourne Fringe Festival,, The Athenaeum Theatre and was directed by Heath McIvor for her latest show Absolutely Normal at the 2018 Melbourne International Comedy Festival at the Malthouse Theatre and the Adelaide Fringe receiving 5 star review.

Showko has appeared on a Japanese TV show Gooto Chikyu bin (グッと地球便) documenting her life and career, TV Tokyo Sekai Naze Sokoninihonjin (世界なぜそこに日本人海外で超有名人スペシャル). NHK Tsurube no Kazokini Kampai (鶴瓶の家族に乾杯), Singapore (Channel NewsAsia: “Primetime Morning”) and Australia on Australia's Got Talent 2016 as a finalist, ABC TV for the "International Women's Day Debate" as well as being interviewed on ABC National Radio with John Faine.

Radio
Prior to becoming a comedian, Showko was a radio presenter and DJ with regular programs for Radio Osaka, FM Uji, Yes FM and Beach Station FM in Japan, and FM96.3 at MediaCorp Singapore.

References

Rakugoka
Japanese women comedians
People from Kobe
Year of birth missing (living people)
Living people
Ventriloquists
Japanese expatriates in Australia
21st-century comedians